TFOT may refer to:

 The Future of Things, a science and technology magazine
 The Fall of Troy (band), a rock trio